WBBT (1340 AM) is a radio station broadcasting an oldies format in AM Stereo and is licensed to Lyons, Georgia, United States.  The station is currently owned by T.C.B. Broadcasting, Inc and features programming from Westwood One .

References

External links

BBT
Radio stations established in 1995